Mahadula  is the Municipal council in district of Nagpur, Maharashtra.

History
Mahadula is a Municipal Council and town in district of Nagpur, Maharashtra. The Mahadula Census Town has population of 21,481 of which 11,145 are males while 10,336 are females as per report released by Census India 2011.

Municipal Council election

Electoral performance 2019

References 

Municipal councils in Maharashtra
Jalgaon district